Vrachnaiika is a town and a former municipality in Achaea, West Greece, Greece. Since the 2011 local government reform it is part of the municipality Patras, of which it is a municipal unit. The municipal unit has an area of 32.111 km2. It is suburb of a Patras, about 11 km southwest of the city centre, on the Gulf of Patras coast. The population of the town is around 2,700 and of the municipal unit around 4,600. The community has a disused rail station on the line from Patras to Pyrgos. The Greek National Road 9 (Patras - Pyrgos) passes south of the centre.

Population history

Subdivisions
The municipal unit Vrachnaiika is subdivided into the following communities (constituent villages in brackets):
Kaminia
Monodendri
Theriano
Tsoukalaiika
Vrachnaiika (Vrachnaiika, Dresthena, Moiraiika)

External links
 GTP - Vrachnaiika
 GTP - Municipality of Vrachnaiika

See also
List of settlements in Achaea

References

 
Populated places in Achaea